Frasat Ali Mughal (31 July 1949 – 13 October 2022) was a Pakistani-born cricketing all-rounder from Kenya who played for the East African cricket team. He played in East Africa's inaugural One Day International against New Zealand, their first match of the 1975 World Cup. In that match, he made a score of 45, the highest ever by anybody from the East African cricket team. He played in all three of East Africa's matches in the World Cup, but did not take any wickets with his medium pacers. 

He died on 13 October 2022.

Frasat Ali was the first player to opening both the batting and the bowling in a One Day International, when he did it in the World Cup match against New Zealand.

References

1949 births
2022 deaths
Pakistani cricketers
East African cricketers
Pakistani emigrants to Kenya
East Africa One Day International cricketers
Cricketers at the 1975 Cricket World Cup
Cricketers from Lahore
Sportspeople of Pakistani descent
Kenyan cricketers